Hello I Love You may refer to:

 "Hello, I Love You", a 1968 song by the Doors
 "Hello (I Love You)", a 2007 song by Roger Waters
 "Hello, I Love You", a 2014 song by Adore Delano from Till Death Do Us Party
 "Hello I Love You", a 1978 song by Crystal Gayle from When I Dream